Dieter Thoma (born 19 October 1969) is a West German/German former ski jumper.

Career
During that time he was the second best German ski jumper after Jens Weißflog. Thoma was not the first known ski jumper in the family: his uncle Georg Thoma was both world and Olympic champion in the nordic combined. Thoma won his first competition in 1990 when he won the Four Hills Tournament. He also won Ski-flying World Championships in Vikersund at the end of the 1989-90 season. Before the start of the 1993-94 season, Thoma changed his technique from jumping with parallel skis to the V-style, and was a part of the German team who won the team competition at the 1994 Winter Olympics in Lillehammer. He also won a bronze medal in the individual normal hill in Lillehammer, then won a silver medal in the team large hill competition at the 1998 Winter Olympics in Nagano. Thoma also won a bronze in the FIS Ski-Flying World Championships 1998 in Oberstdorf.

Thoma won five medals at the FIS Nordic World Ski Championships, including one gold (Team large hill: 1999), two silvers (Team large hill: 1995, Individual large hill: 1997), and two bronzes (Team large hill: 1991 and 1997).

Thoma retired after the 1998/99 season.

World Cup

Standings

Wins

Invalid ski jumping world record

 Not recognized! Crash at world record distance.

References

1969 births
German male ski jumpers
Living people
Olympic ski jumpers of Germany
Olympic ski jumpers of West Germany
Olympic gold medalists for Germany
Olympic silver medalists for Germany
Olympic bronze medalists for Germany
People from Breisgau-Hochschwarzwald
Sportspeople from Freiburg (region)
Ski jumpers at the 1988 Winter Olympics
Ski jumpers at the 1992 Winter Olympics
Ski jumpers at the 1994 Winter Olympics
Ski jumpers at the 1998 Winter Olympics
Olympic medalists in ski jumping
FIS Nordic World Ski Championships medalists in ski jumping
Medalists at the 1998 Winter Olympics
Medalists at the 1994 Winter Olympics